Shane Wright (born January 5, 2004) is a Canadian professional ice hockey centre for the Windsor Spitfires of the Ontario Hockey League (OHL) as a prospect to the Seattle Kraken of the National Hockey League (NHL). Projected as a potential first overall pick throughout the 2021–22 NHL season, Wright was drafted fourth overall in the 2022 NHL Entry Draft by the Kraken.

Internationally, Wright won gold as a member of under-18 Team Canada at the 2021 IIHF World U18 Championships and junior Team Canada at the 2023 World Junior Ice Hockey Championships.

Playing career

Amateur

Kingston Frontenacs (2019–2023)
Wright was granted exceptional player status for the 2019–20 season, becoming the sixth player to be granted exceptional status. The preceding five players were John Tavares, Aaron Ekblad, Connor McDavid, Sean Day and Joe Veleno.

Wright was drafted by the Kingston Frontenacs with the first overall selection in the 2019 OHL Priority Selection. On September 20, 2019, Wright made his OHL debut at the age of 15, as he was held to no points in a 4–1 loss to the Oshawa Generals. One week later, on September 27, Wright scored the first OHL goal in his career against Andrew MacLean of the Oshawa Generals in a 4–1 loss. On October 4, Wright had his first career multi-point game in his OHL career, scoring a goal and adding an assist in an 8–4 loss to the Niagara IceDogs. Wright recorded his first multi-goal game on October 11, as he scored twice, including the overtime winning goal, in a 4–3 victory over the Niagara IceDogs. On December 30, the Frontenacs named Wright an alternate captain of the team, as he became the youngest team captain in CHL history. On February 29, Wright recorded his first career OHL hat trick, as he scored three goals and added an assist for a career-high four points in a game in a 6–1 win over the Flint Firebirds. Wright finished the 2019–20 season with 39 goals and 66 points in 58 games. Wright was named the winner of the Emms Family Award for OHL Rookie of the Year.

Due to the COVID-19 pandemic, the 2020–21 season was cancelled, leaving Wright without a league to play in. His only competitive hockey in that span was an appearance at the 2021 IIHF World U18 Championships.

Wright returned to the Frontenacs for the 2021–22 season. On October 8, 2021, he was named captain of the team, making him the youngest captain in OHL history. Expectations were high based on his rookie season, his performance internationally, and his presumptive status as the first overall pick in the NHL draft, but the season began with only 22 points in 19 games in his first two months. Many attributed this in part to the loss of the prior OHL season. However, he was widely credited with taking major strides in performance for the remainder. Wright finished the regular season with 32 goals and 62 assists, the former less than in his debut season, the latter a significant increase. The Frontenacs qualified for the OHL playoffs, and faced the Oshawa Generals in the first round. Wright scored the series-winning goal in overtime of Game 6 to eliminate the Generals and advance to the second round. The Frontenacs were eliminated by the North Bay Battalion in the second round, concluding his season.

After spending the fall of 2022 playing variously in the NHL, the AHL, and the World Junior Championships, Wright was sent back to the OHL by the Kraken management for the second half of the 2022–23 season. With the Frontenacs not considered to be a competitive team, it was widely speculated that he would soon be traded to another team in advance of the OHL's trade deadline for the OHL playoffs, with teams such as the Ottawa 67's, London Knights, Barrie Colts, and Peterborough Petes rumoured to be interested.

Windsor Spitfires (2023–present) 
Despite rumours that placed the London Knights as frontrunners to secure Wright in trade, on January 9, 2023 he was traded to the Windsor Spitfires in exchange for Ethan Miedema, Gavin McCarthy, five draft picks, and two additional conditional draft picks. This trade was the last of a series of transactions by the Spitfires, the defending OHL Western Conference champions, in advance of the 2023 playoffs. Windsor general manager Bill Bowler said that "anytime you get the captain of the gold-medal winning Team Canada junior team is a great day for the organization and the City of Windsor."

Professional

2022 NHL Entry Draft

Considered the presumptive first overall pick in the 2022 NHL Entry Draft at the start of the season, Wright's status began to be called into question by the midpoint of the 2021–22 season, with many scouts saying that he had "left the door open for someone to unseat him." As the draft approached, debate largely focused on the merits of Wright versus Slovak winger Juraj Slafkovský of Liiga's TPS. The first overall pick was won by the Montreal Canadiens, whose general manager, Kent Hughes, confirmed days before the draft that the choice was between Wright, Slafkovský, and Logan Cooley of the USNTDP. Ultimately the Canadiens used the first overall pick to select Slafkovský, the New Jersey Devils selected Šimon Nemec second and the Arizona Coyotes selected Cooley third, giving the Seattle Kraken an opportunity to draft Wright with the fourth overall pick. He remarked afterward that he was "definitely gonna have a chip on my shoulder" as to being passed over by the first three teams.

Seattle Kraken (2022–present)

On July 13, 2022, Wright signed a three-year entry level contract with the Kraken worth $2.85 million over three years. Kraken general manager Ron Francis stated that he believed Wright would likely play the season with the Kraken. He played 6:14 in his NHL debut on October 12 in a 5–4 overtime loss to the Anaheim Ducks. Following his debut, Wright was a healthy scratch for the following two games before returning to the lineup on October 17. He recorded his first NHL point, an assist, in an October 19 overtime loss to the St. Louis Blues. As October concluded, coach Dave Hakstol's usage of Wright became a major source of debate in the media and among fans, as he was frequently scratched and being played for less than seven minutes per game on average when allowed into the lineup. Following five straight games as a healthy scratch, the Kraken exploited a loophole in league rules to send Wright to their American Hockey League (AHL) affiliate, the Coachella Valley Firebirds, on a conditioning stint. This bypassed the requirement Wright be returned to major junior. After scoring four goals in five AHL games, he returned to the Kraken lineup on December 6, scoring his first career NHL goal in a 4–2 loss against the Canadiens, a result widely called "poetic." After spending time competing with Team Canada, the Kraken returned Wright to the OHL.

International play

 

Wright made his international debut with Team Canada's U18 roster at the 2021 IIHF World U18 Championships, finishing second in the tournament scoring race and scoring two goals in the final against Team Russia to help win the gold medal. Later in the year he was selected for the national U20 team for the 2022 World Junior Championships, but was only able to play two games before the tournament was cancelled due to the Omicron variant. Wright expressed "shock and disappointment". Wright did not play in the rescheduled event, held in August 2022.

Wright was loaned by the Seattle Kraken to Team Canada in advance of the 2023 World Junior Championships in Moncton and Halifax. On December 18, he was named captain of the team for the tournament, which he called a "true honour." During the tournament he recorded four goals and three assists in seven games, winning a gold medal with the team. He was widely praised for his performance in the gold medal game against Team Czechia, which occurred on his birthday.

Career statistics

Regular season and playoffs

International

Awards and honours

References

External links
 

2004 births
Living people
Canadian ice hockey centres
Coachella Valley Firebirds players
Ice hockey people from Ontario
Kingston Frontenacs players
National Hockey League first-round draft picks
Seattle Kraken draft picks
Seattle Kraken players
Sportspeople from Burlington, Ontario
Windsor Spitfires players